, S.J. was a Japanese Roman Catholic priest, mathematician, astronomer, Sinologist, lexicographer, academic and administrator.  Father Paul is known for having developed extensive tables for converting traditional Japanese era dates into Gregorian calendar equivalents — compare, e.g.,  Calendrical Time Conversion Table which is derived from a formula for determining the numbered date in the Japanese month.

Career
After completing studies in Paris, Tsuchihashi was assigned to Shanghai and the observatory at She Shan Hill (Zose). In this period, his work focused on the movement of asteroids.  He also taught mathematics at the Jesuit Aurora University in Xujiahui.

When Sophia University was established in Tokyo in 1913, he became one of the members of the teaching faculty.  He taught mathematics and Chinese literature.  He was Rector of the university from 1940 until the end of the war years.

Honors
 Order of the Sacred Treasure

Selected works
In a statistical overview derived from writings by and about Paul Tsuchihashi, OCLC/WorldCat encompasses roughly 10+ works in 20 publications in 3 languages and 200+ library holdings.

 , 1952  OCLC 001291275

Notes

References
 Totman, Conrad D. (1980). The Collapse of the Tokugawa Bakufu, 1862-1868. Honolulu: University of Hawaii Press. ;  OCLC 185964275
 Webb, Herschel and Marleigh Grayer Ryan. (1994). Research in Japanese Sources: a Guide. Ann Arbor, Michigan: University of Michigan Press.  ;  OCLC 29913782

External links
 Online Tsuchihashi conversion program, NengoCalc (University of Tübingen)

1866 births
1965 deaths
Academic staff of Sophia University
Japanese lexicographers
Recipients of the Order of the Sacred Treasure
Japanese Jesuits